Carlos Miguel Harvey Cesneros (born 3 February 2000) is a Panamaian professional footballer who plays as a defensive midfielder for USL Championship club Phoenix Rising FC and the Panama national team.

Club career
He joined LA Galaxy II on loan from Tauro F.C. in February 2019. On 26 June 2020, Harvey moved to the LA Galaxy first team. He joined LA Galaxy on a permanent basis on 17 February 2021.

Harvey signed with Phoenix Rising FC on February 7, 2023.

International career
Harvey participated at the 2018 CONCACAF U-20 Championship in November 2018. He made his senior international debut for Panama against United States on 27 January 2019 in a friendly match at the State Farm Stadium in Glendale, Arizona.

International goals

References

2000 births
Living people
Sportspeople from Panama City
Association football defenders
Panamanian footballers
Panama international footballers
Tauro F.C. players
LA Galaxy II players
LA Galaxy players
Phoenix Rising FC players
Expatriate soccer players in the United States
Liga Panameña de Fútbol players
USL Championship players
Major League Soccer players
Panama under-20 international footballers